The Runciman Award is an annual literary award offered by the Anglo-Hellenic League for a work published in English dealing wholly or in part with Greece or Hellenism. The award is named in honour of the late Sir Steven Runciman and is currently sponsored (since 2021) by the A.G. Leventis Foundation and the A.C. Laskaridis Charitable Foundation. The value of the prize is £10,000.

Previous winners have included Mark Mazower, Antony Beevor, Richard Clogg, K.E. Fleming, Emily Greenwood, Juliet du Boulay and Bruce Clark. The only person to have won it four times is Roderick Beaton.

Recipients

UK prizes
Prizes awarded for books published in the United Kingdom in the previous year:

UK and Worldwide Prizes
From 2004, prizes have been awarded for books published in English anywhere in the world in the previous year:

References

External links
 

1986 establishments in the United Kingdom
Awards established in 1986
2004 establishments in Greece
Awards established in 2004
Greek literary awards
British non-fiction literary awards